Arabal is a village in Dharmasala Block of Jajpur District Odisha, India.  It is  located at the bank of the River Kelua.  Arabal 12 km from its block Dharmasala.  The village is bounded by Janak on its south, Kotapur on its west,  Bandhadiha on its north and Nathapur on its east.

Geography
The population is approx. 2500 and the literacy rate is 86.19%.

Festivals
Arabal celebrates all festivals with much fanfare and devotion. 
 Dusshera, the festival of Goddess Durga. The whole village comes to a standstill on Ashtami, Navami and in Dashami burning of effigy of the demon Ravana (the eighth, ninth and tenth days of Dussehra).
 Kite flying is also celebrated with much enthusiasm and energy in the village. Kite-flying culminates with the Rajja, with kite-flying competitions being held all over the village. All the other regular Indian festivals like Ganesh Chaturthi, Vasant Panchami, Holi, Rath Yatra, Diwali and the numerous Hindu festivals are also celebrated here.
 Rajja parba (kite war) is also celebrated with great energy. This is one of the big festival in my village and rajja continues for three days.

Culture
Coming to fasts and festivals, in the month of Margasira women folk worship the Goddess Laxmi.  It is the harvest season when grain is thrashed and stored. During this auspicious occasion the mud walls and floors are decorated with murals in white rice paste. These are called Jhoti or Chita and are drown not merely with the intention of decorating the house, but to establish a relationship between the mystical and the material, and thus being highly symbolical and meaningful. Folk painting in the tradition survives till today in all its pristine freshness. Throughout the year the village woman perform several rituals for the fulfillment of their desires.

Muruja is drawn on the floor with powders of different hues. white powder is obtained from the grinding of stone. Green powder is obtained from dry leaves, black from burnt coconut shells, yellow is obtained from petals of marigold flowers or turmeric and red from red clay or bricks. Muruja is generally drown during rituals in the form of Mandala. In the holy month of ‘Kartika’ women observe, penance and draw muruja designs near the Tulasi Chaura.

Pala
Pala represent important aspects of Odisha folk culture. It form an integral part of the lives of the rural folk. Arabal has kept these traditions alive.

Agriculture
Rice is traditionally grown in two well defined seasons, namely kharif and dalua in Arabal.  Of these two, kharif (rainy) is the most important rice season. The kharif rice is the main crop, covering over 85% of the total rice area, and depends entirely on the southwest monsoon. It is sown in June and harvested in October–December, depending upon the duration of the cultivation and topography of the field.  After harvesting kharif rice farmers keeps  them self busy in cultivating badam almond. Badam almond is the main  source of incoming money in Arabal .

Population
Total population of Arabal is 3411. There are 746 houses in the Village.

Population by Sex
There are total of 1699 male persons and 1712 females and a total number of 425 children below 6 years in Arabal.
The percentage of male population is 49.81%.
The percentage of female population is 50.19%.
The percentage of child population is 12.46%.
Males: 1699.
Females: 1712.
Children: 425.

Villages in Jajpur district